Plutonium (94Pu) is an artificial element, except for trace quantities resulting from neutron capture by uranium, and thus a standard atomic weight cannot be given. Like all artificial elements, it has no stable isotopes. It was synthesized long before being found in nature, the first isotope synthesized being 238Pu in 1940. Twenty plutonium radioisotopes have been characterized. The most stable are plutonium-244 with a half-life of 80.8 million years, plutonium-242 with a half-life of 373,300 years, and plutonium-239 with a half-life of 24,110 years. All of the remaining radioactive isotopes have half-lives that are less than 7,000 years. This element also has eight meta states; all have half-lives of less than one second.

The isotopes of plutonium range in atomic weight from 228.0387 u (228Pu) to 247.074 u (247Pu). The primary decay modes before the most stable isotope, 244Pu, are spontaneous fission and alpha emission; the primary mode after is beta emission. The primary decay products before 244Pu are isotopes of uranium and neptunium (not considering fission products), and the primary decay products after are isotopes of americium.

List of isotopes 

|-
| rowspan=2|228Pu
| rowspan=2 style="text-align:right" | 94
| rowspan=2 style="text-align:right" | 134
| rowspan=2|228.03874(3)
| rowspan=2|1.1(+20−5) s
| α (99.9%)
| 224U
| rowspan=2|0+
| rowspan=2|
|-
| β+ (.1%)
| 228Np
|-
| 229Pu
| style="text-align:right" | 94
| style="text-align:right" | 135
| 229.04015(6)
| 120(50) s
| α
| 225U
| 3/2+#
|
|-
| rowspan=2|230Pu
| rowspan=2 style="text-align:right" | 94
| rowspan=2 style="text-align:right" | 136
| rowspan=2|230.039650(16)
| rowspan=2|1.70(17) min
| α
| 226U
| rowspan=2|0+
| rowspan=2|
|-
| β+ (rare)
| 230Np
|-
| rowspan=2|231Pu
| rowspan=2 style="text-align:right" | 94
| rowspan=2 style="text-align:right" | 137
| rowspan=2|231.041101(28)
| rowspan=2|8.6(5) min
| β+
| 231Np
| rowspan=2|3/2+#
| rowspan=2|
|-
| α (rare)
| 227U
|-
| rowspan=2|232Pu
| rowspan=2 style="text-align:right" | 94
| rowspan=2 style="text-align:right" | 138
| rowspan=2|232.041187(19)
| rowspan=2|33.7(5) min
| EC (89%)
| 232Np
| rowspan=2|0+
| rowspan=2|
|-
| α (11%)
| 228U
|-
| rowspan=2|233Pu
| rowspan=2 style="text-align:right" | 94
| rowspan=2 style="text-align:right" | 139
| rowspan=2|233.04300(5)
| rowspan=2|20.9(4) min
| β+ (99.88%)
| 233Np
| rowspan=2|5/2+#
| rowspan=2|
|-
| α (.12%)
| 229U
|-
| rowspan=2|234Pu
| rowspan=2 style="text-align:right" | 94
| rowspan=2 style="text-align:right" | 140
| rowspan=2|234.043317(7)
| rowspan=2|8.8(1) h
| EC (94%)
| 234Np
| rowspan=2|0+
| rowspan=2|
|-
| α (6%)
| 230U
|-
| rowspan=2|235Pu
| rowspan=2 style="text-align:right" | 94
| rowspan=2 style="text-align:right" | 141
| rowspan=2|235.045286(22)
| rowspan=2|25.3(5) min
| β+ (99.99%)
| 235Np
| rowspan=2|(5/2+)
| rowspan=2|
|-
| α (.0027%)
| 231U
|-
| rowspan=4|236Pu
| rowspan=4 style="text-align:right" | 94
| rowspan=4 style="text-align:right" | 142
| rowspan=4|236.0460580(24)
| rowspan=4|2.858(8) y
| α
| 232U
| rowspan=4|0+
| rowspan=4|
|-
| SF (1.37×10−7%)
| (various)
|-
| CD (2×10−12%)
| 208Pb28Mg
|-
| β+β+ (rare)
| 236U
|-
| rowspan=2|237Pu
| rowspan=2 style="text-align:right" | 94
| rowspan=2 style="text-align:right" | 143
| rowspan=2|237.0484097(24)
| rowspan=2|45.2(1) d
| EC
| 237Np
| rowspan=2|7/2−
| rowspan=2|
|-
| α (.0042%)
| 233U
|-
| style="text-indent:1em" | 237m1Pu
| colspan="3" style="text-indent:2em" | 145.544(10)2 keV
| 180(20) ms
| IT
| 237Pu
| 1/2+
|
|-
| style="text-indent:1em" | 237m2Pu
| colspan="3" style="text-indent:2em" | 2900(250) keV
| 1.1(1) μs
|
|
|
|
|-
| rowspan=4|238Pu
| rowspan=4 style="text-align:right" | 94
| rowspan=4 style="text-align:right" | 144
| rowspan=4|238.0495599(20)
| rowspan=4|87.7(1) y
| α
| 234U
| rowspan=4|0+
| rowspan=4|Trace
|-
| SF (1.9×10−7%)
| (various)
|-
| CD (1.4×10−14%)
| 206Hg32Si
|-
| CD (6×10−15%)
| 180Yb30Mg28Mg
|-
| rowspan=2|239Pu
| rowspan=2 style="text-align:right" | 94
| rowspan=2 style="text-align:right" | 145
| rowspan=2|239.0521634(20)
| rowspan=2|2.411(3)×104 y
| α
| 235U
| rowspan=2|1/2+
| rowspan=2|Trace
|-
| SF (3.1×10−10%)
| (various)
|-
| style="text-indent:1em" | 239m1Pu
| colspan="3" style="text-indent:2em" | 391.584(3) keV
| 193(4) ns
|
|
| 7/2−
|
|-
| style="text-indent:1em" | 239m2Pu
| colspan="3" style="text-indent:2em" | 3100(200) keV
| 7.5(10) μs
|
|
| (5/2+)
|
|-
| rowspan=3|240Pu
| rowspan=3 style="text-align:right" | 94
| rowspan=3 style="text-align:right" | 146
| rowspan=3|240.0538135(20)
| rowspan=3|6.561(7)×103 y
| α
| 236U
| rowspan=3|0+
| rowspan=3|Trace
|-
| SF (5.7×10−6%)
| (various)
|-
| CD (1.3×10−13%)
| 206Hg34Si
|-
| rowspan=3|241Pu
| rowspan=3 style="text-align:right" | 94
| rowspan=3 style="text-align:right" | 147
| rowspan=3|241.0568515(20)
| rowspan=3|14.290(6) y
| β− (99.99%)
| 241Am
| rowspan=3|5/2+
| rowspan=3|
|-
| α (.00245%)
| 237U
|-
| SF (2.4×10−14%)
| (various)
|-
| style="text-indent:1em" | 241m1Pu
| colspan="3" style="text-indent:2em" | 161.6(1) keV
| 0.88(5) μs
|
|
| 1/2+
|
|-
| style="text-indent:1em" | 241m2Pu
| colspan="3" style="text-indent:2em" | 2200(200) keV
| 21(3) μs
|
|
|
|
|-
| rowspan=2|242Pu
| rowspan=2 style="text-align:right" | 94
| rowspan=2 style="text-align:right" | 148
| rowspan=2|242.0587426(20)
| rowspan=2|3.75(2)×105 y
| α
| 238U
| rowspan=2|0+
| rowspan=2|
|-
| SF (5.5×10−4%)
| (various)
|-
| 243Pu
| style="text-align:right" | 94
| style="text-align:right" | 149
| 243.062003(3)
| 4.956(3) h
| β−
| 243Am
| 7/2+
|
|-
| style="text-indent:1em" | 243mPu
| colspan="3" style="text-indent:2em" | 383.6(4) keV
| 330(30) ns
|
|
| (1/2+)
|
|-
| rowspan=3|244Pu
| rowspan=3 style="text-align:right" | 94
| rowspan=3 style="text-align:right" | 150
| rowspan=3|244.064204(5)
| rowspan=3|8.00(9)×107 y
| α (99.88%)
| 240U
| rowspan=3|0+
| rowspan=3|Trace
|-
| SF (.123%)
| (various)
|-
| β−β− (7.3×10−9%)
| 244Cm
|-
| 245Pu
| style="text-align:right" | 94
| style="text-align:right" | 151
| 245.067747(15)
| 10.5(1) h
| β−
| 245Am
| (9/2−)
|
|-
| 246Pu
| style="text-align:right" | 94
| style="text-align:right" | 152
| 246.070205(16)
| 10.84(2) d
| β−
| 246mAm
| 0+
|
|-
| 247Pu
| style="text-align:right" | 94
| style="text-align:right" | 153
| 247.07407(32)#
| 2.27(23) d
| β−
| 247Am
| 1/2+#
|

Actinides vs fission products

Notable isotopes 
Plutonium-238 has a half-life of 87.74 years and emits alpha particles. Pure 238Pu for radioisotope thermoelectric generators that power some spacecraft is produced by neutron capture on neptunium-237 but plutonium from spent nuclear fuel can contain as much as a few percent 238Pu, originating from 237Np, alpha decay of 242Cm, or (n,2n) reactions.
Plutonium-239 is the most important isotope of plutonium, with a half-life of 24,100 years. 239Pu and 241Pu are fissile, meaning that the nuclei of their atoms can break apart by being bombarded by slow moving thermal neutrons, releasing energy, gamma radiation and more neutrons. It can therefore sustain a nuclear chain reaction, leading to applications in nuclear weapons and nuclear reactors. 239Pu is synthesized by irradiating uranium-238 with neutrons in a nuclear reactor, then recovered via nuclear reprocessing of the fuel. Further neutron capture produces successively heavier isotopes.
Plutonium-240 has a high rate of spontaneous fission, raising the background neutron radiation of plutonium containing it. Plutonium is graded by proportion of 240Pu: weapons grade (< 7%), fuel grade (7–19%) and reactor grade (> 19%). Lower grades are less suited for nuclear weapons and thermal reactors but can fuel fast reactors.
Plutonium-241 is fissile, but also beta decays with a half-life of 14 years to americium-241.
Plutonium-242 is not fissile, not very fertile (requiring 3 more neutron captures to become fissile), has a low neutron capture cross section, and a longer half-life than any of the lighter isotopes.
Plutonium-244 is the most stable isotope of plutonium, with a half-life of about 80 million years. It is not significantly produced in nuclear reactors because 243Pu has a short half-life, but some is produced in nuclear explosions. Plutonium-244 has been found in interstellar space and is has the longest half-life of any non-primordial radioisotope.

Production and uses

239Pu, a fissile isotope that is the second most used nuclear fuel in nuclear reactors after uranium-235, and the most used fuel in the fission portion of nuclear weapons, is produced from uranium-238 by neutron capture followed by two beta decays.

240Pu, 241Pu, and 242Pu are produced by further neutron capture. The odd-mass isotopes 239Pu and 241Pu have about a 3/4 chance of undergoing fission on capture of a thermal neutron and about a 1/4 chance of retaining the neutron and becoming the next heavier isotope. The even-mass isotopes are fertile material but not fissile and also have a lower overall probability (cross section) of neutron capture; therefore, they tend to accumulate in nuclear fuel used in a thermal reactor, the design of nearly all nuclear power plants today. In plutonium that has been used a second time in thermal reactors in MOX fuel, 240Pu may even be the most common isotope. All plutonium isotopes and other actinides, however, are fissionable with fast neutrons. 240Pu does have a moderate thermal neutron absorption cross section, so that 241Pu production in a thermal reactor becomes a significant fraction as large as 239Pu production.

241Pu has a half-life of 14 years, and has slightly higher thermal neutron cross sections than 239Pu for both fission and absorption. While nuclear fuel is being used in a reactor, a 241Pu nucleus is much more likely to fission or to capture a neutron than to decay. 241Pu accounts for a significant proportion of fissions in thermal reactor fuel that has been used for some time. However, in spent nuclear fuel that does not quickly undergo nuclear reprocessing but instead is cooled for years after use, much or most of the 241Pu will beta decay to americium-241, one of the minor actinides, a strong alpha emitter, and difficult to use in thermal reactors.

242Pu has a particularly low cross section for thermal neutron capture; and it takes three neutron absorptions to become another fissile isotope (either curium-245 or 241Pu) and fission. Even then, there is a chance either of those two fissile isotopes will fail to fission but instead absorb a fourth neutron, becoming curium-246 (on the way to even heavier actinides like californium, which is a neutron emitter by spontaneous fission and difficult to handle) or becoming 242Pu again; so the mean number of neutrons absorbed before fission is even higher than 3. Therefore, 242Pu is particularly unsuited to recycling in a thermal reactor and would be better used in a fast reactor where it can be fissioned directly. However, 242Pu's low cross section means that relatively little of it will be transmuted during one cycle in a thermal reactor. 242Pu's half-life is about 15 times as long as 239Pu's half-life; therefore, it is 1/15 as radioactive and not one of the larger contributors to nuclear waste radioactivity.
242Pu's gamma ray emissions are also weaker than those of the other isotopes.

243Pu has a half-life of only 5 hours, beta decaying to americium-243. Because 243Pu has little opportunity to capture an additional neutron before decay, the nuclear fuel cycle does not produce the long-lived 244Pu in significant quantity.

238Pu is not normally produced in as large quantity by the nuclear fuel cycle, but some is produced from neptunium-237 by neutron capture (this reaction can also be used with purified neptunium to produce 238Pu relatively free of other plutonium isotopes for use in radioisotope thermoelectric generators), by the (n,2n) reaction of fast neutrons on 239Pu, or by alpha decay of curium-242, which is produced by neutron capture from 241Am. It has significant thermal neutron cross section for fission, but is more likely to capture a neutron and become 239Pu.

Manufacture

Plutonium-240, -241 and -242

The fission cross section for 239Pu is 747.9 barns for thermal neutrons, while the activation cross section is 270.7 barns (the ratio approximates to 11 fissions for every 4 neutron captures). The higher plutonium isotopes are created when the uranium fuel is used for a long time. For high burnup used fuel, the concentrations of the higher plutonium isotopes will be higher than the low burnup fuel that is reprocessed to obtain weapons grade plutonium.

Plutonium-239

Plutonium-239 is one of the three fissile materials used for the production of nuclear weapons and in some nuclear reactors as a source of energy. The other fissile materials are uranium-235 and uranium-233. Plutonium-239 is virtually nonexistent in nature. It is made by bombarding uranium-238 with neutrons in a nuclear reactor. Uranium-238 is present in quantity in most reactor fuel; hence plutonium-239 is continuously made in these reactors. Since plutonium-239 can itself be split by neutrons to release energy, plutonium-239 provides a portion of the energy generation in a nuclear reactor.

Plutonium-238

There are small amounts of 238Pu in the plutonium of usual plutonium-producing reactors. However, isotopic separation would be quite expensive compared to another method: when a  235U atom captures a neutron, it is converted to an excited state of 236U. Some of the excited 236U nuclei undergo fission, but some decay to the ground state of 236U by emitting gamma radiation. Further neutron capture creates 237U, which has a half-life of 7 days and thus quickly decays to 237Np. Since nearly all neptunium is produced in this way or consists of isotopes that decay quickly, one gets nearly pure 237Np by chemical separation of neptunium. After this chemical separation, 237Np is again irradiated by reactor neutrons to be converted to 238Np, which decays to 238Pu with a half-life of 2 days.

Plutonium-240 as an obstacle to nuclear weapons
Plutonium-240 undergoes spontaneous fission as a secondary decay mode at a small but significant rate (%). The presence of 240Pu limits the plutonium's use in a nuclear bomb, because the neutron flux from spontaneous fission initiates the chain reaction prematurely, causing an early release of energy that physically disperses the core before full implosion is reached. This prevents most of the core from participation in the chain reaction and reduces the bomb's power.

Plutonium consisting of more than about 90% 239Pu is called weapons-grade plutonium; plutonium from spent nuclear fuel from commercial power reactors generally contains at least 20% 240Pu and is called reactor-grade plutonium. However, modern nuclear weapons use fusion boosting, which mitigates the predetonation problem; if the pit can generate a nuclear weapon yield of even a fraction of a kiloton, which is enough to start deuterium–tritium fusion, the resulting burst of neutrons will fission enough plutonium to ensure a yield of tens of kilotons.

Contamination due to 240Pu is the reason plutonium weapons must use the implosion method. Theoretically, pure 239Pu could be used in a gun-type nuclear weapon, but achieving this level of purity is prohibitively difficult. Plutonium-240 contamination has proven a mixed blessing to nuclear weapons design. While it created delays and headaches during the Manhattan Project because of the need to develop implosion technology, those same difficulties are currently a barrier to nuclear proliferation. Implosion devices are also inherently more efficient and less prone to accidental detonation than are gun-type weapons.

References 
 Isotope masses from:

 Isotopic compositions and standard atomic masses from:

 Half-life, spin, and isomer data selected from the following sources.

 
Plutonium
Plutonium